Burnaby is a city in British Columbia, Canada.

Burnaby may also refer to:

Places in British Columbia:
Burnaby (provincial electoral district), a former district that was partitioned prior to the 1966 election
Burnaby (electoral district), a federal electoral district from 1976 to 1987
Burnaby Range, a small mountain range
Burnaby Mountain
Burnaby Lake (see Burnaby Lake Regional Park)
Burnaby Island

Other places:
Pointe Burnaby, a minor summit in the Swiss Alps
4719 Burnaby, an asteroid
Burnaby, a community in the township of Wainfleet, Ontario, Canada

People:
Burnaby (surname)
George Burnaby Drayson (1913–1983), British Conservative Member of Parliament

Other uses:
Burnaby baronets, an extinct title in the Baronetage of the United Kingdom
Burnaby-class ferry, two ferries serving in British Columbia